Labdia echioglossa is a moth in the family Cosmopterigidae. It was described by Edward Meyrick in 1928. It known from Peninsular Malaysia and Malacca.

References

Labdia
Moths described in 1928